Ninox is a genus of true owls comprising 36 species found in Asia and Australasia. Many species are known as hawk-owls or boobooks, but the northern hawk-owl (Surnia ulula) is not a member of this genus.

Taxonomy
The genus was introduced by English naturalist Brian Houghton Hodgson in 1837 with the type species as Ninox nipalensis, a junior synonym of Strix lugubris Tickell 1833. Strix lugubris is now considered a subspecies of the brown boobook (Ninox scutula lugubris).

Species
The genus contains 37 species:

† Laughing owl,  Ninox albifacies (extinct)
 Rufous owl,  Ninox rufa
 Powerful owl,  Ninox strenua
 Barking owl,  Ninox connivens
 Sumba boobook,  Ninox rudolfi
 Australian boobook, Ninox boobook
 Rote boobook Ninox rotiensis 
 Timor boobook Ninox fusca
 Alor boobook, Ninox plesseni
 Tasmanian boobook, Ninox leucopsis
 Morepork,  Ninox novaeseelandiae
 Northern boobook, Ninox japonica
 Brown boobook,  Ninox scutulata
 Hume's boobook,  Ninox obscura
 Chocolate boobook, Ninox randi
 Andaman boobook,  Ninox affinis
 Philippine hawk-owl group
 Luzon boobook, Ninox philippensis
 Mindanao boobook, Ninox spilocephala
 Camiguin boobook, Ninox leventisi
 Sulu boobook, Ninox reyi
 Cebu boobook, Ninox rumseyi
 Romblon boobook, Ninox spilonotus
 Mindoro boobook, Ninox mindorensis
 Least boobook, Ninox sumbaensis
 Togian boobook, Ninox burhani
 Ochre-bellied boobook,  Ninox ochracea
 Cinnabar boobook,  Ninox ios
 Moluccan boobook group
 Halmahera boobook, Ninox hypogramma
 Buru boobook, Ninox hantu
 Seram boobook, Ninox squamipila
 Tanimbar boobook, Ninox forbesi
 Christmas boobook,  Ninox natalis
 Manus boobook,  Ninox meeki
 Papuan boobook,  Ninox theomacha
 Speckled boobook,  Ninox punctulata
 New Britain boobook,  Ninox odiosa
 New Ireland boobook,  Ninox variegata

Genomic studies of the extinct laughing owl of New Zealand indicate that it actually belongs in Ninox rather than the monotypic genus Sceloglaux. The fossil owls "Otus" wintershofensis and "Strix" brevis, both from the Early or Middle Miocene of Wintershof, Germany, are close to this genus; the latter was sometimes explicitly placed in Ninox (Olson 1985), but is now in Intutula. "Strix" edwardsi from the Late Miocene of La Grive St. Alban, France, might also belong into this group.

In human culture 
"NINOX" is an Australian Army project to develop night-vision goggles; it is named after Ninox strenua.

References

Olson, Storrs L. (1985): IX.C. Strigiformes. In: Farner, D.S.; King, J.R. & Parkes, Kenneth C. (eds.): Avian Biology 8: 129–132. Academic Press, New York.

Further reading

 
Bird genera